Michael J. Webber (born March 7, 1978) is a Republican member of the Michigan Senate. He previously served in the Michigan House of Representatives, where he represented the 45th district.

Outside of politics, Webber is Catholic and an insurance agent.

References

External links 
 Michael Webber at gophouse.org

Living people
1978 births
Michigan city council members
Michigan State University alumni
Republican Party members of the Michigan House of Representatives
Republican Party Michigan state senators
Catholics from Michigan
People from Santa Monica, California
21st-century American politicians